Mahboob Alam (born 1 January 1968) is a Pakistani politician who had been a member of the National Assembly of Pakistan, from June 2013 to May 2018.

Early life
He was born on 1 January 1968.

Political career

He was elected to the National Assembly of Pakistan as a candidate of Muttahida Qaumi Movement (MQM) from Constituency NA-242 (Karachi-IV) in 2013 Pakistani general election. He received 166,836 votes and defeated Akram Khan, a candidate of Pakistan Tehreek-e-Insaf (PTI).

In April 2018, he quit MQM and joined Pak Sarzameen Party (PSP).

References

Living people
Muttahida Qaumi Movement politicians
Pakistani MNAs 2013–2018
Politicians from Karachi
Muttahida Qaumi Movement MNAs
1968 births